

Group 1

League table

Group 2

League table

Group 3

Group 3–A

League table

Group 3–B

League table

Group 3–Finals

|}

Group 4

Group 4–A

League table

Group 4–B

League table

Group 4–Finals

|}

Promotion play-off

Semi-finals

|}

Tiebreaker

|}

Finals

|}

Notes

External links
LFP website

Tercera División seasons
3
Spain